Sam-A Gaiyanghadao (born October 13, 1983) is a Muay Thai fighter from Thailand formerly signed to ONE Championship until his retirement. He was, up until the title was taken from him by Prajanchai on the 30th of July 2021, is a former ONE Strawweight Kickboxing World Champion and ONE Strawweight Muay Thai World Champion. He is formerly trained and taught in the prestigious Evolve MMA gym in Singapore. As of 1 August 2020, he is ranked the #6 strawweight in the world by Combat Press.

Sam-A is known for competing in the first Muay Thai match in ONE Championship. He is a former ONE Flyweight Muay Thai World Champion (being the first to hold the title), in addition to being a former four-division Thailand Champion and two-division Lumpinee Stadium Champion. His other Muay Thai accolades include being named Lumpinee Fighter of the Year and Sport Writers Friends Fighter of the Year, winning both awards in 2011. He is regarded as one of the best Muay Thai fighters in the world, and known for his strong defense and counter offense.

Biography

Early career
Sam-a began fighting at age 9 after following the career of his uncle and watching Muay Thai on TV.  Within a few years he had already had a couple hundred fights and was fighting nearly every week. At 15 he moved to Bangkok and began training at the Petchyindee Muay Thai academy.

Stadium Success
By the turn of the century Sam-A was fighting at both Lumpinee boxing stadium and Rajadamnern boxing stadium. He won his first stadium title in 2004 when he beat Petch T. Bangsean for the super flyweight championship of Lumpinee. Soon after he won the Thailand championship at the same weight.

2008
By 2008 he was one of the biggest stars in Muay Thai and was frequently headlining major shows. At the beginning of the year he beat Petchboonchu FA Group for the vacant Thailand bantamweight title, and shortly after beat him again by a stoppage from an accumulation of kicks. Following a loss to Captainkane Narupai, Sam-A would stop top-tier fighters, Jenrop Sakhomsin, Penek Sitnumnoi, and Rungruanglek Lukprabart all in a row. He closed the year out by capturing the Lumpinee championship with a win over Detnarong Wor. Sangprapai.

2009 - 2010
Sam-a continued his great run of fighting in 2009 by starring in a classic rivalry with fan favorite, Pornsanae Sitmonchai. Within a 12-month period the two would go on to fight 5 times, with Sam-A winning 4 of those. His single loss would come in 2010 from a controversial knockdown called late in the fight. In this time, he emerged as a "Yodmuay" (super fighter) and became one of the few fighters in Thailand who were making 100,000 baht per fight. In 2010 he split wins over another rival, Rungruanglek Lukprabart. Towards the end of 2010, he would move up to 126 pounds and challenge top fighter Nong-O Sit Or at Lumpinee Stadium. Soon after, he would stay up in weight and again lose to a bigger fighter, Singtongnoi Por.Telakun. The size difference proved to be too much for Sam-A.

2011 - 2012
In 2011, he came back down to his natural weight and surpassed his 2008 year by going 8-0-1 and winning the Lumpinee Fighter of the Year award. His fight with reigning Fighter of the Year Kongsak Sitboonmee was amongst the biggest and most anticipated of the year. The fight was very close at the end and was ruled a draw. Soon after Sam-A's promoter told him he would buy him a new Toyota pickup truck if he won five straight fights. Sure enough he did, and Sam-A was awarded with a new Toyota pickup valued at over $50,000 after a dominant decision win over Tingtong Chor. Koyahu-Isuzu. In 2011, he changed his name from Sam-A Thor. Ratonakiat to Sam-A Gaiyanghadaogym. Despite having "gym" in the name, it is nothing more than a sponsor, with "Gaiyanghadao" literally meaning "5-star grilled chicken". For his first fight of 2012, he defeated Rungruanglek Lukprapbart by unanimous decision, and in doing so may have finished a long rivalry between the two with a 4–3 record head-to-head. The only other fighter he has fought 7 times was Yodsaenklai Fairtex.

On May 4, Sam-A fought Penake Sitnumnoi at Lumpinee Stadium with the winner expected to receive the prestigious Fighter of the Year award. Penake dropped Sam-A with an elbow in the fourth round and won by unanimous decision. During the fight, Sam-A suffered a thigh injury which caused him to stop training Muay Thai and turn to boxing instead.

Professional boxing 
On July 12, 2012, Sam-A had his first career professional boxing match. He fought Christian Abila and won by 4th-round TKO.

He made his Muay Thai comeback on August 6 and defeated Tong by unanimous decision at Lumpinee Stadium.

He was scheduled to rematch Penake Sitnumnoi on October 4, 2012, at Lumpinee but the fight was postponed when Penake suffered a shoulder injury.

He beat Petpanomrung Wor Sungprapai by decision at Lumpinee Stadium on November 2, 2012.

2013 - 2014 
Sam-A rematched Pokaew Fonjaenchonburi on February 7, 2013, and the pair fought to a draw.

He beat Yokwitaya Petsimean on points at Lumpinee Stadium on May 10, 2013.

He TKO'd Phet Utong Or. Kwanmuang in round two at Lumpinee Stadium on June 7, 2013.

Sam-a beat Superlek Wor Sangrapai on points to win the vacant Thailand super bantamweight title at Lumpinee Stadium on July 12, 2013.

On October 21, 2014, Sam-A defeated  Andrew Doyle by fourth-round KO to win the WBC World 60 kg Title

2016 
On July 29, 2016, Sam-A fought Japanese kickboxer, Yuya Kono in Japan. He stopped Kono in the third round with an elbow knockout.

Sam-A retired from fighting following the fight and moved to Singapore where he joined Evolve MMA as a Muay Thai instructor.

ONE Championship 
Sam-A signed with ONE Championship when the promotion unveiled their new all-striking format: the ONE Super Series.

2018 
On January 26, 2018, he faced Joseph Lasiri at ONE Championship: Global Superheroes in the promotion's first-ever Muay Thai contest, defeating the Italian via second-round TKO.

He followed that up with a KO victory over Sergio Wielzen on May 18, 2018, to claim ONE's inaugural ONE Super Series Flyweight Muay Thai World Championship at ONE Championship: Unstoppable Dreams.

2019 
In his first title defense on May 4, 2019, he lost the title in upset fashion to England's Jonathan Haggerty by unanimous decision at ONE Championship: For Honor.

Following his title loss, Sam-A Gaiyanghadao moved down to strawweight and eventually made his return to ONE Championship on October 13, 2019, at Tokyo. He faced Darren Rolland in Part 1 of ONE Championship: Century, where he knocked out the Frenchman in the second round.

Sam-A Gaiyanghadao then faced Wang Junguang for the inaugural ONE Strawweight Kickboxing World Championship at ONE Championship: Mark Of Greatness on December 6, 2019. Sam-A defeated Wang Junguang by unanimous decision to become the first ONE Kickboxing Strawweight World Champion, as well as the second two-sport World Champion in ONE Championship.

2020 
Next, Sam-A was looking to win a second title as he faced Rocky Ogden for the inaugural ONE Strawweight Muay Thai World Championship at ONE Championship: King of the Jungle on February 28, 2020. After dominating the entire fight, Sam-A would go on to win by unanimous decision and become the first ONE Muay Thai Strawweight World Champion, becoming ONE Championship's second two-sport world champion in the process.

Sam-A was then scheduled to make his first defense of the ONE Strawweight Muay Thai World Championship against Josh Tonna, who was coming off a two straight wins. The two faced at ONE Championship: Reign of Dynasties on October 9, 2020. Coming into the fight as a huge favorite, Sam-A defeated Tonna via second-round TKO after delivering three knockdowns to retain the title.

2021 
Sam-A made his second defense of the ONE Muay Thai Strawweight Championship against fellow countryman and ONE promotional newcomer Prajanchai P.K.Saenchaimuaythaigym at ONE Championship: Battleground on July 30, 2021. After five hard-fought rounds, he ultimately lost the title by majority decision.

2022
In February 2022, it was reported that Sam-A had retired from international competition after returning to Thailand from Singapore, where he had coached at Evolve MMA. On February 10, 2023, Nuttadaj Vachirarattanawong promoter of Petchyindee Academy announced Sam-A has not retired due to arm injury and want to return to Thailand for treatment, but the ONE team fired them back and released the news that Sam-A had retirement. Chitinat Asadamongkol, president of ONE Championship Thailand, stating that organization has never released news that Sam-A will retired and Sam-A himself is still in the contract, but who went back to fight with Petchyindee battle earlier, because Nuttadaj contacted him to negotiate and there is a discussion which organization allows, with matters of this nature having to be discussed on a case-by-case basis.

2023
After won Tongnoi Lukbanyai and Samingdam Chor.Ajalaboon at Petchyindee in Rajadamnern Stadium, Sam-A faced Ryan Sheehan on March 17, 2023, at ONE Friday Fights 9. He won the fight via knockout in the second round.

Personal life
Sam-A and his wife have two daughters and they live in Buriram, Thailand.

Titles and accomplishments

Muay Thai
Lumpinee Stadium
2004 Lumpinee Stadium Super Flyweight Champion (52 kg / 115 lb)
2008 Lumpinee Stadium Bantamweight Champion (55 kg / 122 lb) (4 Defenses)
2011 Lumpinee Stadium Fighter of the Year
Professional Boxing Association of Thailand (PAT) 
 2004 Thailand Super Flyweight Champion (52 kg / 115 lb) 
 2006 Thailand Bantamweight Champion (53.5 kg / 118 lb) 
 2009 Thailand Super Bantamweight Champion (55 kg / 122 lb) (3 defenses)
 2014 Thailand Featherweight Champion (57 kg / 126 lb)
WBC Muaythai 
2014 WBC Muaythai International Super Featherweight Champion (60 kg / 132 lb)
Toyota Marathon Muay Thai
2015 Toyota Marathon Tournament Featherweight Champion (57 kg / 126 lb)
Sports Authority of Thailand
 2011 Sports Authority of Thailand Fighter of the Year
ONE Championship
2018 ONE Flyweight Muay Thai World Champion (61.2 kg / 135 lb)
 2020 ONE Strawweight Muay Thai World Champion (56.7 kg / 125 lb) (1 Defense)
 Petchyindee True4U
 2022 True4U 126lb Champion.

Kickboxing
ONE Championship 
2019 ONE Strawweight Kickboxing World Champion (56.7 kg / 125 lb) (Current)

Muay Thai record

|- style="background:#cfc;"
| 2023-03-17||Win ||align=left| Ryan Sheehan || ONE Friday Fights 9 || Bangkok, Thailand || KO (Left cross) || 2 ||2:52

|-  style="background:#cfc;"
| 2022-10-20 || Win ||align=left| Samingdam Chor.Ajalaboon || Petchyindee, Rajadamnern Stadium || Bangkok, Thailand || Decision || 5 || 3:00

|-  style="background:#cfc;"
| 2022-05-12 || Win ||align=left| Tongnoi Lukbanyai || Petchyindee, Rajadamnern Stadium || Bangkok, Thailand || Decision || 5 ||  3:00
|-
! style=background:white colspan=9 |
|-  style="background:#fbc;"
| 2021-07-30|| Loss ||align=left| Prajanchai P.K.Saenchaimuaythaigym ||  |ONE Championship: Battleground || Kallang, Singapore || Decision (Majority) || 5 ||3:00
|-
! style=background:white colspan=9 |
|-  style="background:#cfc;"
| 2020-10-09|| Win ||align=left| Josh Tonna ||  |ONE Championship: Reign of Dynasties || Kallang, Singapore || TKO (3 Knockdowns) || 2 ||2:30
|-
! style=background:white colspan=9 |
|-  style="background:#cfc;"
| 2020-02-28|| Win ||align=left| Rocky Ogden ||  |ONE Championship: King of the Jungle || Kallang, Singapore || Decision (Unanimous) || 5 || 3:00
|-
! style=background:white colspan=9 |
|-  style="background:#cfc;"
| 2019-12-06|| Win ||align=left| Wang Junguang ||  |ONE Championship: Mark Of Greatness || Kuala Lumpur, Malaysia || Decision (Unanimous)|| 5 || 3:00
|-
! style=background:white colspan=9 |
|-
|-  style="background:#cfc;"
| 2019-10-13|| Win||align=left| Darren Rolland || ONE Championship: Century Part 1 || Tokyo, Japan || KO (Left Hook) || 2 || 1:20 
|-
|-  style="background:#fbc;"
| 2019-05-03|| Loss ||align=left| Jonathan Haggerty ||  ONE Championship: For Honor  || Jakarta, Indonesia || Decision || 5 || 3:00 
|-
! style=background:white colspan=9 |
|-
|-  style="background:#cfc;"
| 2018-05-18|| Win||align=left| Sergio Wielzen|| ONE Championship: Unstoppable Dreams || Kallang, Singapore || KO (Right Elbow) || 4 || 
|-
! style=background:white colspan=9 |
|-
|-  style="background:#cfc;"
| 2018-01-26|| Win||align=left| Joseph Lasiri || ONE Championship: Global Superheroes || Manila, Philippines || KO (Straight Left) || 2 ||
|-
|-  style="background:#cfc;"
| 2016-07-29|| Win||align=left| Yuya Kono || Toyota Marathon || Japan || KO (elbow) || 3 ||
|-  style="background:#cfc;"
| 2015-12-25|| Win||align=left| Petsongkom Sitjaroentab || Toyota Marathon, Final || Bangkok, Thailand || Decision || 3 ||3:00 
|-  bgcolor="#cfc"
! style=background:white colspan=9 |
|-  style="background:#cfc;"
| 2015-12-25|| Win||align=left| Palangtip Sripeung  || Toyota Marathon, Semi Finals || Bangkok, Thailand || Decision || 3 ||3:00 
|-  style="background:#fbc;"
| 2015-10-07|| Loss||align=left| Bangpleenoi 96Penang || Rajadamnern Stadium || Bangkok, Thailand || Decision || 5 ||3:00 
|-  style="background:#cfc;"
| 2015-09-15 || Win ||align=left| Klasuk Petjinda || Lumpinee Stadium  || Bangkok, Thailand || Decision || 5 || 3:00
|-  style="background:#cfc;"
| 2015-08-14 ||Win ||align=left| Petsongkom Sitjaroentab || Toyota Marathon, Final   || Thailand || Decision || 3 || 3:00
|-
|-  style="background:#cfc;"
| 2015-08-14 ||Win ||align=left| Thomas Chaicharoen || Toyota Marathon, Semi-final  || Thailand || Decision || 3 || 3:00
|-
|-  style="background:#cfc;"
| 2015-08-14 ||Win ||align=left| Andres Arturo || Toyota Marathon, Quarter-final   || Thailand || TKO (low kicks) || 3 || 
|-
|-  style="background:#fbc;"
| 2015-04-29 ||Loss ||align=left| Panpayak Jitmuangnon || Rajadamnern Stadium || Bangkok, Thailand || KO(Left high kick) || 1 || 1:20 
|-
|-  style="background:#fbc;"
| 2015-03-06 ||Loss ||align=left| Panpayak Jitmuangnon || Lumpinee Stadium || Bangkok, Thailand || Decision || 5 || 3:00 
|-
|-  bgcolor="#cfc"
! style=background:white colspan=9 |
|-  style="background:#cfc;"
| 2015-01-26|| Win ||align=left| Detchsakda Sitsongpeenong || Rajadamnern Stadium || Bangkok, Thailand || TKO (low kicks) || 4 || 
|-  style="background:#cfc;"
| 2014-12-20|| Win ||align=left| Trishin Constantine || Topking World Series || Hong Kong || Decision || 3 || 
|-
|-  style="background:#cfc;"
| 2014-11-25 || Win ||align=left| Bangpleenoi 96Penang || Lumpinee Stadium || Bangkok, Thailand || KO || 3 || 
|-
|-
! style=background:white colspan=9 |
|-  style="background:#cfc;"
| 2014-10-21|| Win ||align=left| Andrew Doyle || Universal Chinese Martial Arts Association Event || Hong Kong || KO  || 4 || 
|-
! style=background:white colspan=9 |
|-  style="background:#fbc;"
| 2014-08-14|| Loss ||align=left| Thaksinlek Kiatniwat || Rajadamnern Stadium || Bangkok, Thailand || KO (head kick) || 2 || 
|-
|-  style="background:#cfc;"
| 2014-07-15 || Win ||align=left| ET Por Tor Tortawee || Lumpinee Stadium || Bangkok, Thailand || KO || 4 || 
|-
|-  style="background:#fbc;"
| 2014-06-11|| Loss ||align=left| Pettawee Sor Kittichai || Rajadamnern Stadium || Bangkok, Thailand || KO (head kick) || 3 || 
|-
|-  style="background:#cfc;"
| 2014-05-17 || Win ||align=left| Ayoub el Khaidar || Impacts Fight Night 4 || Bordeaux, France || KO (head kick) || 4 || 
|-
|-  style="background:#cfc;"
| 2014-03-30 || Win ||align=left| Sangmanee Sor Tienpo || Charity Event for School || Songkhla, southern Thailand || Decision || 5 || 3:00
|-
|-  style="background:#fbc;"
| 2014-02-28 || Loss ||align=left| Superbank Sakchaichode || Lumpinee 4Man Tournament || Bangkok, Thailand || Decision || 3 || 3:00  
|-
|-  style="background:#cfc;"
| 2014-02-08 || Win ||align=left| Hakim Hamech || La Nuit Des Titans  || Tours, France || KO (elbow) || 4 || 
|-
|-  style="background:#cfc;"
| 2014-01-07 || Win ||align=left| Nongbeer Chokngamwong || Lumpinee Stadium  || Bangkok, Thailand || Decision || 5 || 3:00
|-
|-  style="background:#fbc;"
| 2013-12-03 || Loss ||align=left| Superbank Sakchaichode || Lumpinee Stadium || Bangkok, Thailand || Decision || 5 || 3:00  
|-
|-  bgcolor="#cfc"
! style=background:white colspan=9 |
|-  style="background:#cfc;"
| 2013-10-31 ||Win ||align=left| Stephen Meleady || Toyota marathon  || Thailand || Decision || 3 || 3:00
|-
|-  style="background:#cfc;"
| 2013-10-11 ||Win ||align=left| Kwankhao Mor.Ratanabandit || Lumpinee Stadium || Bangkok, Thailand || Decision || 5 || 3:00
|-
|-  style="background:#cfc;"
| 2013-09-04 ||Win ||align=left| Superlek Kiatmuu9|| Rajadamnern Stadium || Bangkok, Thailand || Decision || 5 || 3:00
|-
|-  style="background:#cfc;"
| 2013-07-12 ||Win ||align=left| Superlek Kiatmuu9 || Lumpinee Stadium || Bangkok, Thailand || Decision || 5 || 3:00
|-
! style=background:white colspan=9 |
|-
|-  style="background:#cfc;"
| 2013-06-07 ||Win ||align=left| Phet Utong Or. Kwanmuang || Lumpinee Stadium || Bangkok, Thailand || TKO (Low kick) || 2 || 
|-  style="background:#cfc;"
| 2013-05-10 || Win ||align=left| Yokwitaya Petsimean || Lumpinee Stadium || Bangkok, Thailand || Decision || 5 || 3:00
|-  style="background:#cfc;"
| 2013-04-09 ||Win ||align=left| Phet Utong Or. Kwanmuang || Lumpinee Stadium || Bangkok, Thailand || Decision || 5 || 3:00 
|-  style="background:#c5d2ea;"
| 2013-02-07 || Draw ||align=left| Pokaew Fonjangchonburi || Rajadamnern Stadium || Bangkok, Thailand || Decision draw || 5 || 3:00   
|-
|-  style="background:#fbc;"
| 2013-01-04 || Loss ||align=left| Petpanomrung Kiatmuu9 || Lumpinee Stadium || Bangkok, Thailand || Decision || 5 || 3:00  
|-
|-  style="background:#cfc;"
| 2012-12-07 ||Win ||align=left| Pokaew Fonjangchonburi || Lumpinee Stadium || Bangkok, Thailand || Decision || 5 || 3:00 
|-
! style=background:white colspan=9 |
|-  style="background:#cfc;"
| 2012-11-02 || Win ||align=left| Petpanomrung Kiatmuu9 || Petchyindee Fight, Lumpinee Stadium || Bangkok, Thailand || Decision || 5 || 3:00  
|-  style="background:#cfc;"
| 2012-08-07 ||Win ||align=left| Thong Puideenaidee || Lumpinee Stadium || Bangkok, Thailand || Decision || 5 || 3:00 
|-  style="background:#fbc;"
| 2012-05-04 || Loss ||align=left| Penake Sitnumnoi || Lumpinee Stadium || Bangkok, Thailand || Decision || 5 || 3:00
|-
|-  bgcolor="#cfc"
! style=background:white colspan=9 |
|-  style="background:#cfc;"
| 2012-03-02 || Win ||align=left| Petpanomrung Kiatmuu9 || Lumpinee Stadium || Bangkok, Thailand || Decision  || 5  ||  3:00
|-
|-  style="background:#cfc;"
| 2012-01-12 ||Win ||align=left| Rungruanglek Lukprabat || Rajadamnern Stadium || Bangkok, Thailand || Decision || 5 || 3:00 
|-
|-  style="background:#cfc;"
| 2011-12-09 ||Win ||align=left| Ritidej Wor. Wanthavee || Lumpinee Stadium || Bangkok, Thailand || TKO (Low kicks) || 4 ||  
|-
|-  style="background:#cfc;"
| 2011-10-07 ||Win ||align=left| Tingtong Chor. Koyahu-Isuzu || Lumpinee Stadium || Bangkok, Thailand || Decision || 5 || 3:00 
|-
|-  style="background:#cfc;"
| 2011-08-30 ||Win ||align=left| Rungruanglek Lukprabat || Lumpinee Stadium || Bangkok, Thailand || Decision || 5 || 3:00 
|-
|-  style="background:#cfc;"
| 2011-08-02 ||Win ||align=left| Lekklar Thanasukarn || Lumpinee Stadium || Bangkok, Thailand || Decision || 5 || 3:00 
|-
|-  style="background:#cfc;"
| 2011-07-07 ||Win ||align=left| Tingtong Chor. Koyahu-Isuzu || Rajadamnern Stadium || Bangkok, Thailand || Decision || 5 || 3:00 
|-
|-  style="background:#cfc;"
| 2011-06-10 ||Win ||align=left| Thong Puideenaidee || Lumpinee Stadium || Bangkok, Thailand || Decision || 5 || 3:00 
|-
|-  bgcolor="#cfc"
! style=background:white colspan=9 |
|-  style="background:#c5d2ea;"
| 2011-05-10 ||Draw ||align=left| Kongsak Saenchaimuaythaigym || Lumpinee Stadium || Bangkok, Thailand || Decision || 5 || 3:00 
|-
|-  style="background:#cfc;"
| 2011-03-08 ||Win ||align=left| Pokaew Fonjangchonburi || Lumpinee Stadium || Bangkok, Thailand || Decision || 5 || 3:00 
|-
|-  style="background:#cfc;"
| 2011-02-05 ||Win ||align=left| Manasak Pinsinchai || Siam Omnoi || Bangkok, Thailand || Decision || 5 || 3:00 
|-
|-  style="background:#fbc;"
| 2010-12-29 ||Loss ||align=left| Rungruanglek Lukprabat || Rajadamnern Stadium || Bangkok, Thailand || Decision || 5 || 3:00 
|-
|-  style="background:#cfc;"
| 2010-12-07 ||Win ||align=left| Thong Puideenaidee || Lumpinee Stadium || Bangkok, Thailand || Decision || 5 || 3:00 
|-
|-  bgcolor="#cfc"
! style=background:white colspan=9 |
|-  style="background:#fbc;"
| 2010-11-02 ||Loss ||align=left| Singtongnoi Por.Telakun || Lumpinee Stadium || Bangkok, Thailand || Decision || 5 || 3:00 
|-
|-  style="background:#cfc;"
| 2010-10-05 ||Win ||align=left| Rungruanglek Lukprabat || Lumpinee Stadium || Bangkok, Thailand || Decision || 5 || 3:00 
|-
|-  bgcolor="#cfc"
! style=background:white colspan=9 |
|-  style="background:#fbc;"
| 2010-09-07 ||Loss ||align=left| Nong-O Sit Or || Lumpinee Stadium || Bangkok, Thailand || Decision || 5 || 3:00 
|-
|-  style="background:#cfc;"
| 2010-07-13 ||Win ||align=left| Trijak Sitjomtrai || Lumpinee Stadium || Bangkok, Thailand || Decision || 5 || 3:00 
|-
|-  style="background:#cfc;"
| 2010-06-04 ||Win ||align=left| Rungpet Wor. Sangprapai || Lumpinee Stadium || Bangkok, Thailand || Decision || 5 || 3:00 
|-
|-  style="background:#cfc;"
| 2010-05-07 ||Win ||align=left| Pakorn PKSaenchaimuaythaigym || Lumpinee Stadium || Bangkok, Thailand || Decision || 5 || 3:00 
|-
|-  style="background:#cfc;"
| 2010-03-05 ||Win ||align=left| Pettawee Sor Kittichai || Lumpinee Stadium || Bangkok, Thailand || Decision || 5 || 3:00 
|-
|-  style="background:#fbc;"
| 2010-02-10 ||Loss ||align=left| Pornsanae Sitmonchai || Rajadamnern Stadium || Bangkok, Thailand || Decision || 5 || 3:00 
|-
|-  style="background:#cfc;"
| 2010-01-15 ||Win ||align=left| Traijak Sitjomtrai || Lumpinee Stadium || Bangkok, Thailand || Decision || 5 || 3:00 
|-
|-  style="background:#cfc;"
| 2009-12-08 ||Win ||align=left| Lekklar Thanasukarn || Lumpinee Stadium || Bangkok, Thailand || Decision || 5 || 3:00 
|-
|-  bgcolor="#cfc"
! style=background:white colspan=9 |
|-  style="background:#fbc;"
| 2009-11-13 ||Loss ||align=left| Rungruanglek Lukprabat || Lumpinee Stadium || Bangkok, Thailand || Decision || 5 || 3:00 
|-
|-  style="background:#cfc;"
| 2009-09-25 ||Win ||align=left| Pornsanae Sitmonchai || Lumpinee Stadium || Bangkok, Thailand || Decision || 5 || 3:00 
|-
|-  style="background:#cfc;"
| 2009-09-04 ||Win ||align=left| Wuttidet Lukprabat || Lumpinee Stadium || Bangkok, Thailand || Decision || 5 || 3:00 
|-
|-  bgcolor="#cfc"
! style=background:white colspan=9 |
|-  style="background:#fbc;"
| 2009-08-06 ||Loss ||align=left| Pettawee Sor Kittichai || Rajadamnern Stadium || Bangkok, Thailand || Decision || 5 || 3:00 
|-
|-  style="background:#cfc;"
| 2009-07-03 ||Win ||align=left| Pakorn PKSaenchaimuaythaigym || Lumpinee Stadium || Bangkok, Thailand || Decision || 5 || 3:00 
|-
|-  style="background:#cfc;"
| 2009-05-26 ||Win ||align=left| Pornsanae Sitmonchai || Lumpinee Stadium || Bangkok, Thailand || Decision || 5 || 3:00 
|-
|-  style="background:#fbc;"
| 2009-03-03 ||Loss ||align=left| Rungruanglek Lukprabat || Lumpinee Stadium || Bangkok, Thailand || Decision || 5 || 3:00 
|-
|-  style="background:#cfc;"
| 2009-02-06 ||Win ||align=left| Pornsanae Sitmonchai || Lumpinee Stadium || Bangkok, Thailand || Decision || 5 || 3:00 
|-
|-  style="background:#cfc;"
| 2009-01-06 ||Win ||align=left| Pornsanae Sitmonchai || Lumpinee Stadium || Bangkok, Thailand || Decision || 5 || 3:00 
|-
|-  style="background:#cfc;"
| 2008-12-09 ||Win ||align=left| Karnchai Fairtex || Lumpinee Stadium || Bangkok, Thailand || Decision || 5 || 3:00 
|-
|-  style="background:#cfc;"
| 2008-10-31 ||Win ||align=left| Detnarong Wor. Sangprapai || Lumpinee Stadium || Bangkok, Thailand || Decision || 5 || 3:00 
|-  bgcolor="#cfc"
! style=background:white colspan=9 |
|-  style="background:#fbc;"
| 2008-09-30 ||Loss ||align=left| Karnchai Fairtex || Lumpinee Stadium || Bangkok, Thailand || Decision || 5 || 3:00 
|-
|-  style="background:#cfc;"
| 2008-09-04 ||Win ||align=left| Rungruanglek Lukprabat || Rajadamnern Stadium || Bangkok, Thailand || KO || 4 ||  
|-
|-  style="background:#cfc;"
| 2008-08-08 ||Win ||align=left| Penake Sitnumnoi || Lumpinee Stadium || Bangkok, Thailand || KO (Elbow) || 4 || 
|-
|-  style="background:#cfc;"
| 2008-06-04 ||Win ||align=left| Jenrop Sakhomsin || Lumpinee Stadium || Bangkok, Thailand || TKO (Low Kick) || 4 ||  
|-
|-  style="background:#fbc;"
| 2008-03-25 ||Loss ||align=left| Captiankane Narupai || Lumpinee Stadium || Bangkok, Thailand || Decision || 5 || 3:00 
|-
|-  style="background:#cfc;"
| 2008-02-29 ||Win ||align=left| Petchboonchu FA Group || Lumpinee Stadium || Bangkok, Thailand || TKO (Low kicks) || 4 || 
|-

|-  style="background:#fbb;"
| 2008-02-05 || Loss||align=left| Wuttidet Lukprabat || Lumpinee Stadium || Bangkok, Thailand || Decision || 5 || 3:00

|-  style="background:#cfc;"
| 2008-01-04 ||Win ||align=left| Petchboonchu FA Group || Lumpinee Stadium || Bangkok, Thailand || Decision || 5 || 3:00 
|-
|-  style="background:#cfc;"
| 2007-12-07 ||Win ||align=left| Chatchai Sor. Thonayong || Lumpinee Stadium || Bangkok, Thailand || Decision || 5 || 3:00 
|-
|-  style="background:#cfc;"
| 2007-07-06 ||Win ||align=left| Rakkiat Kiatprapat || Lumpinee Stadium || Bangkok, Thailand || Decision || 5 || 3:00 
|-
|-  style="background:#cfc;"
| 2007-06-08 ||Win ||align=left| Kampichit Riflownasoundna || Lumpinee Stadium || Bangkok, Thailand || Decision || 5 || 3:00 
|-
|-  style="background:#fbc;"
| 2007-05-04 ||Loss ||align=left| Detnarong Wor. Sangprapai || Lumpinee Stadium || Bangkok, Thailand || Decision || 5 || 3:00 
|-
|-  style="background:#cfc;"
| 2007-03-02 ||Win ||align=left| Detnarong Wor. Sangprapai || Lumpinee Stadium || Bangkok, Thailand || Decision || 5 || 3:00 
|-
|-  style="background:#cfc;"
| 2007-01-30 ||Win ||align=left| Songkom Wor. Sangprapai || Lumpinee Stadium || Bangkok, Thailand || Decision || 5 || 3:00 
|-
|-  style="background:#cfc;"
| 2007-01-05 ||Win ||align=left| Deathsuriya Sitthiprasert || Lumpinee Stadium || Bangkok, Thailand || TKO || 3 || 
|-
|-  style="background:#cfc;"
| 2006-11-24 ||Win ||align=left| Kampichit Riflownasoundna || Lumpinee Stadium || Bangkok, Thailand || Decision || 5 || 3:00 
|-
|-  style="background:#fbc;"
| 2006-10-24 ||Loss ||align=left| Manasak Narupai || Lumpinee Stadium || Bangkok, Thailand || Decision || 5 || 3:00 
|-
|-  style="background:#c5d2ea;"
| 2006-10-03 ||Draw ||align=left| Kampichit Riflownasoundna || Lumpinee Stadium || Bangkok, Thailand || Decision || 5 || 3:00 
|-
|-  style="background:#c5d2ea;"
| 2006-08-11 ||Draw ||align=left| Phaysaer Gardensviewgym || Lumpinee Stadium || Bangkok, Thailand || Decision || 5 || 3:00 
|-
|-  style="background:#cfc;"
| 2006-06-20 ||Win ||align=left| Kompayak Fairtex || Lumpinee Stadium || Bangkok, Thailand || Decision || 5 || 3:00 
|-
|-  style="background:#cfc;"
| 2006-05-16 ||Win ||align=left| Doungpichio A. Siriphon || Lumpinee Stadium || Bangkok, Thailand || Decision || 5 || 3:00 
|-
|-  bgcolor="#cfc"
! style=background:white colspan=9 |
|-  style="background:#c5d2ea;"
| 2006-04-21 ||Draw ||align=left| Kompayak Fairtex || Lumpinee Stadium || Bangkok, Thailand || Decision || 5 || 3:00 
|-
|-  style="background:#cfc;"
| 2006-03-14 ||Win ||align=left| Yodthongchai Sor. Suwatchai || Lumpinee Stadium || Bangkok, Thailand || TKO || 3 ||  
|-
|-  style="background:#cfc;"
| 2006-02-14 ||Win ||align=left| Daoprasak Keatkamtorn || Lumpinee Stadium || Bangkok, Thailand || Decision || 5 || 3:00 
|-
|-  style="background:#fbc;"
| 2006-01-24 ||Loss ||align=left| Rungruanglek Lukprabat || Phetpiya, Lumpinee Stadium || Bangkok, Thailand || Decision || 5 || 3:00 
|-
|-  style="background:#cfc;"
| 2005-12-06 ||Win ||align=left| Kangwanlek Petyindee || Lumpinee Stadium || Bangkok, Thailand || Decision || 5 || 3:00 
|-
|-  style="background:#cfc;"
| 2005-11-03 ||Win ||align=left| Chaiyo Soonkilabannon || Rajadamnern Stadium || Bangkok, Thailand || Decision || 5 || 3:00 
|-
|-  style="background:#cfc;"
| 2005-08-12 ||Win ||align=left| Nuttapon Kor. Kumpai || Lumpinee Stadium || Bangkok, Thailand || Decision || 5 || 3:00 
|-
|-  style="background:#cfc;"
| 2005-05-24 ||Win ||align=left| Kangwanlek Petyindee || Lumpinee Stadium || Bangkok, Thailand || Decision || 5 || 3:00 
|-
|-  style="background:#fbc;"
| 2005-03-29 ||Loss ||align=left| Songkom Wor. Sangprapai || Lumpinee Stadium || Bangkok, Thailand || TKO || 4 ||  
|-
|- 
! style=background:white colspan=9 |

|-  style="background:#fbc;"
| 2005-03-04 ||Loss ||align=left| Kangwanlek Petyindee || Lumpinee Stadium || Bangkok, Thailand || Decision || 5 || 3:00 
|-
|-  style="background:#fbc;"
| 2005-02-01 ||Loss ||align=left| Pettawee Sor Kittichai || Lumpinee Stadium || Bangkok, Thailand || Decision || 5 || 3:00 
|-
|-  style="background:#cfc;"
| 2004-12-07 ||Win ||align=left| Petch T. Baengsean || Lumpinee Stadium || Bangkok, Thailand || Decision || 5 || 3:00 
|-
|-  bgcolor="#cfc"
! style=background:white colspan=9 |

|-  style="background:#cfc;"
| 2004-11-05 ||Win ||align=left| Sakmongkon Lukprabart || Lumpinee Stadium || Bangkok, Thailand || TKO || 3 || 
|-
|-  style="background:#fbc;"
| 2004-10-09 ||Loss ||align=left| Petch T.Bangsean || Lumpinee Stadium || Bangkok, Thailand || Decision || 5 || 3:00 
|-

|-  style="background:#cfc;"
| 2004-07-20 ||Win ||align=left| Chalermdeat Sor. Tawanrung || Lumpinee Stadium || Bangkok, Thailand || Decision || 5 || 3:00 
|-
|-  style="background:#fbc;"
| 2004-06-22 ||Loss ||align=left| Kaew Fairtex || Lumpinee Stadium || Bangkok, Thailand || Decision || 5 || 3:00 
|-
|-  style="background:#cfc;"
| 2004-05-28 ||Win ||align=left| Petch T. Baengsean || Lumpinee Stadium || Bangkok, Thailand || Decision || 5 || 3:00 
|-
|-  style="background:#fbc;"
| 2004-04-21 ||Loss ||align=left| Wuttidet Lukprabat || Rajadamnern Stadium || Bangkok, Thailand || Decision || 5 || 3:00 
|-
|-  style="background:#cfc;"
| 2004-03-30 ||Win ||align=left| Petch Por. Purapa || Lumpinee Stadium || Bangkok, Thailand || Decision || 5 || 3:00 
|-
|-  style="background:#cfc;"
| 2004-02-24 ||Win ||align=left| Duangsompong Por. Kumpai || Lumpinee Stadium || Bangkok, Thailand || Decision || 5 || 3:00 
|-
|-  style="background:#cfc;"
| 2004-01-27 ||Win ||align=left| Chartchainoi Sitbenjama || Lumpinee Stadium || Bangkok, Thailand || TKO || 5 || 
|-
|-  style="background:#fbc;"
| 2003-12-09 ||Loss ||align=left| Daoprasuk Sitpafar || Lumpinee Stadium || Bangkok, Thailand || Decision || 5 || 3:00 
|-
|-  style="background:#cfc;"
| 2003-11-14 ||Win ||align=left| Pongsirong Keatcharnsing || Lumpinee Stadium || Bangkok, Thailand || Decision || 5 || 3:00 
|-
|-  style="background:#cfc;"
| 2003-10-10 ||Win ||align=left| Patiharn Sor. Kittichai || Lumpinee Stadium || Bangkok, Thailand || Decision || 5 || 3:00 
|-
|-  style="background:#cfc;"
| 2003-09-16 ||Win ||align=left| Kangwanlek Petyindee || Lumpinee Stadium || Bangkok, Thailand || Decision || 5 || 3:00 
|-
|-  style="background:#cfc;"
| 2003-08-22 ||Win ||align=left| Sungyut Wor. Suntannon || Lumpinee Stadium || Bangkok, Thailand || Decision || 5 || 3:00 
|-
|-  style="background:#cfc;"
| 2003-07-29 ||Win ||align=left| Daoprasuk Sitpafar || Lumpinee Stadium || Bangkok, Thailand || Decision || 5 || 3:00 
|-
|-  style="background:#fbc;"
| 2003-06-10 ||Loss ||align=left| Sungyut Wor. Suntannon || Lumpinee Stadium || Bangkok, Thailand || Decision || 5 || 3:00

|-  style="background:#cfc;"
|  ||Win ||align=left| Tingtong Saengsawangpanrapla  ||  || Bangkok, Thailand || Decision || 5 || 3:00

|-  style="background:#cfc;"
|  ||Win ||align=left| Sarawut Lukbanyai  || Lumpinee Stadium || Bangkok, Thailand || Decision || 5 || 3:00

|-  style="background:#cfc;"
| 2001-12-29 ||Win ||align=left| Yai Sitsamuchai  || Lumpinee Stadium || Bangkok, Thailand || Decision || 5 || 3:00
|-
| colspan=9 | Legend:

Professional boxing record

|-
|-  style="background:#cfc;"
| 2012-07-12 ||Win ||align=left| Christian Abila || || Sara Buri, Thailand || TKO || 4 ||  
|-
| colspan=9 | Legend:

References

External links

Gaiyanghadao, Sam-A
Gaiyanghadao, Sam-A
Sam-A Gaiyanghadao
Sam-A Gaiyanghadao
Gaiyanghadao, Sam-A
ONE Championship kickboxers
ONE Championship champions